The 1953 Florida A&M Rattlers football team was an American football team that represented Florida A&M University as a member of the Southern Intercollegiate Athletic Conference (SIAC) during the 1953 college football season. In their ninth season under head coach Jake Gaither, the Rattlers compiled a 10–1 record. The team's sole loss was to Prairie View A&M in the Orange Blossom Classic. The team played its home games at Bragg Stadium in Tallahassee, Florida.

Schedule

References

Florida AandM
Florida A&M Rattlers football seasons
Black college football national champions
Florida AandM Rattlers football